Nancy Tate is an American politician from Brandenburg, Kentucky. She is a Republican and represents District 27 in the State House. Her district includes all of Meade County as well as the northern portion of Hardin County, including the cities of Radcliff and Fort Knox. Before entering politics, she worked for the United Parcel Service.

Political positions
Tate is a staunch pro-lifer, chairing the Kentucky House’s pro-life caucus. In 2022, she promoted a constitutional amendment that would have clarified the Constitution of Kentucky does not “secure or protect a right to abortion”.

References 

Living people
Republican Party members of the Kentucky House of Representatives
Women state legislators in Kentucky
21st-century American politicians
21st-century American women politicians
Year of birth missing (living people)